The 2016–17 Hamburger SV season was the 129th season in the club's football history. In 2016–17 the club played in the Bundesliga, the top tier of German football. It was the club's 54th consecutive season in this league, being the only club to have played every season in the Bundesliga since its introduction in 1963.

Players

First-team squad
Squad at end of season

Left club during season

Competitions

Overview

Bundesliga

League table

Results summary

Results by round

Matches

DFB-Pokal

Statistics

Appearances and goals

|-
! colspan=14 style=background:#dcdcdc; text-align:center| Goalkeepers

|-
! colspan=14 style=background:#dcdcdc; text-align:center| Defenders

|-
! colspan=14 style=background:#dcdcdc; text-align:center| Midfielders

|-
! colspan=14 style=background:#dcdcdc; text-align:center| Forwards

|-
! colspan=14 style=background:#dcdcdc; text-align:center| Players transferred out during the season

Goalscorers

Last updated: 20 May 2017

Clean sheets

Last updated: 7 May 2017

Disciplinary record

Last updated: 20 May 2017

References

Hamburger SV seasons
Hamburger SV